The molecular formula C8H6O4 (molar mass: 166.14 g/mol, exact mass: 166.0266 u) may refer to:

 Isophthalic acid
 Phthalic acid
 Terephthalic acid (TPA)

Molecular formulas